The Oxford University Broadcasting Society (OUBS) was a student society at the University of Oxford, England. It covered radio and television broadcasting.

The officers include a president, secretary, treasurer, programme coordinator, technical director, news editor, social secretary, and two ordinary committee members. Equipment included a Uher 4000L portable tape recorder.

Collaboration
For some years, OUBS used the BBC Radio Oxford studio in Wellington Square, Oxford to produce radio programmes for Radio Oxford and the Oxford Hospitals Broadcasting Association (OHBA), (later known as Radio Cherwell from 1967) It also used the studios at the Churchill Hospital, Oxford, home of the Oxford Hospitals Broadcasting Association, which ran a radio station known as Radio Cherwell.

Aubrey Singer, controller of BBC2, spoke to the society in 1975.

Former members

 Jackie Ashley
 Zeinab Badawi
 Tim Beech
 Jonathan Bowen
 Angus Deayton
 Sally Jones
 Robert Orchard
 Nigel Rees
 Carol Sennett (née Tarr)
 John Shaw

See also
 Oxide Radio (started 2001)

References

Organizations with year of establishment missing
Organizations with year of disestablishment missing
Radio organisations in the United Kingdom
Broadcasting Society
Broadcasting Society
Student radio in the United Kingdom